Udea micacea is a moth of the family Crambidae. It is endemic to the Hawaiian islands of Kauai, Oahu, Molokai and Maui.

The color pattern in adult males differs from that of females. In the males there is a depressed, longitudinal, pale streak between veins 6 and 7 at the base.

The larvae feed on Cyrtandra species, including Cyrtandra cordifolia.

External links

Moths described in 1881
Endemic moths of Hawaii
micacea